Yves Boissier (born 27 January 1944) is a French fencer. He competed in the team épée event at the 1968 Summer Olympics.

References

External links
 

1944 births
Living people
French male épée fencers
Olympic fencers of France
Fencers at the 1968 Summer Olympics
People from Montélimar
Sportspeople from Drôme